Charles Hamlin may refer to:

 Charles Sumner Hamlin (1861–1938), American lawyer and first Chairman of the Federal Reserve
 Charles Hamlin (general) (1837–1911), Union Army major during the American Civil War
 Charles Hamlin (rower) (born 1947), American Olympic rower